Hardin County is a county located in the U.S. state of Tennessee. As of the 2020 census, the population was 26,831. The county seat is Savannah. Hardin County is located north of and along the borders of Mississippi and Alabama. The county was founded in November 1819 and named posthumously for Col. Joseph Hardin, a Revolutionary War soldier and a legislative representative for the Province of North Carolina; the State of Franklin; and the Southwest Territory. Hardin County was the site of the  Battle of Shiloh (also known as the Battle of Pittsburg Landing) during the Civil War.

History

The Hardin Expedition
Two parties of settlers (totaling 26) struck out from Knoxville, Tennessee in late spring of 1816 bound for the general area which would eventually become Savannah, Tennessee. The first party, traveling by boat, came by way of the Tennessee River, landing in May at "the easteward curve of the Tennessee" at Cerro Gordo.

The second, and larger, party had traversed overland and encountered several delays.  Upon the arrival of the second group, the parties finally rejoined at Johnson Creek, near present day Savannah. It was now July, and the pioneers set about the laying down of the first permanent settlement by non-Native Americans in the area.

This second party was led by Joseph Hardin, Jr., son of Col. Joseph Hardin who had, before his death, accumulated several land grants to the area as rewards for his Revolutionary War service. Joseph, Jr. was accompanied on the trip by his brother, James Hardin. James was the founder of what would become the first county seat, Hardinville. The settlement was created in 1817 on nearby Hardin’s Creek —on the site of what was later renamed Old Town, Tennessee. Both men executed land grants in the area.  They had fought alongside their father in the war and had been likewise rewarded with their own land patents, as well as inheriting some of their father's unclaimed grants.

Other settlers in the expedition continued further downriver, establishing another community at Saltillo, in 1817.

County creation
For eleven days after its initial establishment (in November 1819), the boundaries of Hardin County reached from Wayne County west to the Mississippi River. The establishment of then neighboring Shelby County and others continued to diminish the size of Hardin until it reached its present boundaries. The county was named for Revolutionary War veteran, Joseph Hardin, a former colonial assemblyman for the Province of North Carolina, Speaker of the House for the unrecognized State of Franklin and a territorial legislator of the Southwest Territory.

Battle of Shiloh

Hardin County was the site of the 1862 Battle of Shiloh (also known as the Battle of Pittsburg Landing) during the Civil War. The battleground is several miles south of Savannah, and extends into Tishomingo County, Mississippi.

Geography

Hardin County is located in western southern Tennessee (although part of the county is east of the Tennessee River, the county is considered part of the "Grand Division" of West Tennessee). The county is divided into two nearly equal divisions by the Tennessee River, which enters about midway on the south side and passes out near the northeast corner, flowing northwards. The length of the county from north to south is about 30 miles, and its greatest width, from east to west, about 21.

Adjacent counties

Decatur County (north)
Wayne County (east)
Lauderdale County, Alabama (southeast)
Tishomingo County, Mississippi (south)
Alcorn County, Mississippi (southwest)
McNairy County (west)
Chester County (northwest)
Henderson County (north)

National protected area
Shiloh National Military Park

State protected areas
Dry Creek Wildlife Management Area
Pickwick Landing State Park
Walker Branch State Natural Area
White Oak Wildlife Management Area

Demographics

2020 census

As of the 2020 United States census, there were 26,831 people, 10,137 households, and 7,203 families residing in the county.

2000 census
At the 2000 census there were 25,578 people, 10,426 households, and 7,444 families in the county.  The population density was 44 people per square mile (17/km²).  There were 12,807 housing units at an average density of 22 per square mile (9/km²).  The racial makeup of the county was 94.91% White, 3.69% Black or African American, 0.20% Native American, 0.16% Asian, 0.02% Pacific Islander, 0.30% from other races, and 0.72% from two or more races.  1.02%. were Hispanic or Latino of any race. 45.1% were of American, 9.8% Irish, 9.7% English and 9.5% German ancestry according to Census 2000.

Of the 10,426 households 29.70% had children under the age of 18 living with them, 57.30% were married couples living together, 10.10% had a female householder with no husband present, and 28.60% were non-families. 25.50% of households were one person and 11.80% were one person aged 65 or older.  The average household size was 2.41 and the average family size was 2.87.

The age distribution was 23.10% under the age of 18, 7.90% from 18 to 24, 26.60% from 25 to 44, 26.40% from 45 to 64, and 16.10% 65 or older.  The median age was 40 years. For every 100 females there were 96.70 males.  For every 100 females age 18 and over, there were 92.20 males.

The median household income was $27,819 and the median family income  was $34,157. Males had a median income of $28,357 versus $18,806 for females. The per capita income for the county was $15,598.  About 14.60% of families and 18.80% of the population were below the poverty line, including 25.80% of those under age 18 and 17.80% of those age 65 or over.

Politics

Hardin County is overwhelmingly Republican, and, even before the rapid trend of the upland South away from the Democratic Party, was a Unionist Republican enclave in historically Democratic West Tennessee. This is due to the shallow, humus-poor and easily erodible Highland Rim soils, which were much less suitable for plantation farming than the rest of Middle and West Tennessee. Since the Civil War, only three Democratic Presidential candidates have ever carried Hardin County – Franklin D. Roosevelt in 1936, Jimmy Carter in 1976, and Bill Clinton in 1992 – with only FDR achieving a margin of more than 100 votes.

Education 
Hardin County has one community and several city elementary schools, and also has a middle school. The county has one high school, Hardin County High School, whose sports teams are nicknamed "The Tigers". The Savannah-Hardin County Center, a branch campus of Jackson State Community College, has operated in the City of Savannah, offering an Associate of Science degree in General Studies, since 1998. The University of Memphis has occasionally offered classes at the Center in the past, but there were no classes scheduled there in the summer or fall of 2009.  There is also the Tennessee Technology Center at Crump.

Hardin County Schools
 Hardin County High School
 Hardin County Middle School
 Hardin County East Elementary School
 Hardin County West Elementary School
 Savannah North Elementary School
 Pickwick Southside Elementary School
 Parris South Elementary School

Private Schools
 Savannah Christian Academy

Emergency services
Hardin County maintains its own Level 4 Trauma Center out of Hardin Medical Center in Savannah. Emergency medical services to Savannah and the surrounding county are provided by a paid 24/7 ambulance service based out of this hospital. Fire protection to the city of Savannah is provided by a 24-hour paid Fire Department based out of two stations, with five pieces of apparatus. The County of Hardin is protected by a combination of paid and volunteer Firefighter/First-Responder and Firefighter/EMT-IV level engine companies, based out of 15 Fire Districts and with approximately 60 pieces of apparatus. The county also maintains a disaster/mass casualty team and a HAZMAT Team.

Communities

Cities
Crump
Savannah (county seat)

Towns
Adamsville (partial)
Milledgeville (partial)
Saltillo

Census-designated places
Olivet
Walnut Grove

Other unincorporated communities

 Big Ivy
 Bucktown
 Caney Hollow
 Cerro Gordo
 Childers Hill
 Counce
 Crossroads
 Grandview
 Hamburg
 Hinkle
 Hookers Bend
 Hurley
 Lebanon
 Maddox
 Morris Chapel
 Nixon
 Oak Grove
 Olivehill
 Pickwick Dam
 Pittsburg Landing
 Pyburn
 Red Sulphur Springs
 Shady Grove
 Shiloh
 Southside
 Swift
 Thompson Crossroads
 Walkertown
 Winn Springs

Ghost Town
 Hardinville

See also
National Register of Historic Places listings in Hardin County, Tennessee

Notes

References

Further reading
 Hardin County, Tennessee: A Pictorial History. Nashville: Turner Publishing (1994). 
 Brazelton, B.G. A History of Hardin County, Tennessee. Charleston: Bibliolife (2008). 
 Hays, Tony. On the banks of the river: A history of Hardin County, Tennessee. Savannah: Tennessee River Museum (1996).

External links

 Hardin County Guide
 Hardin County, TNGenWeb - free genealogy resources for the county

 
1819 establishments in Tennessee
Hardin family
West Tennessee